Pasteur Island is a small rocky island at the southeast end of the Dumoulin Islands, close north of Astrolabe Glacier Tongue. Photographed from the air by U.S. Navy Operation Highjump, 1946–47. Charted by the French Antarctic Expedition, 1949–51. Named by the French Antarctic Expedition, 1951–52, for Louis Pasteur, famous French chemist who made notable contributions to medical science.

See also 
 List of Antarctic and sub-Antarctic islands
 List of things named after Louis Pasteur

Islands of Adélie Land